The battle of Serres took place in June 1205 in the town of Serres (Syar) in contemporary Greece between the Bulgarian Empire and the Latin Empire. It resulted in a Bulgarian victory.

Origins of the conflict 
After the stunning victory in the battle of Adrianople (1205) the Bulgarians gained control of most of Thrace except several larger cities which Emperor Kaloyan wanted to capture. In June 1205 he moved the theatre of the military actions to the south-west towards the domains of Boniface Montferrat, the King of Thessalonica and vassal of the Latin Empire.

The battle 
The first town on the way of the Bulgarian army was Serres. The Crusaders tried to fight back in the vicinity of the town, but after the dead of the commander Hugues de Coligny were defeated and had to pull back to the town but during their retreat the Bulgarian troops also entered Serres. The remaining Latins under the command of Guillaume d'Arles were besieged in the citadel. In the negotiations which followed Kaloyan agreed to give them safe conduct to the Bulgarian-Hungarian border. However, when the garrison surrendered, the knights were killed while the ordinary people were spared.

Aftermath 

The successful campaign in 1205 ended with the capture of Philippopolis. The Byzantine nobility of the city, led by Alexios Aspietes, resisted. After Kaloyan seized the city its ramparts were destroyed and Aspietes was hanged. In the following year the war against the Latin Empire and the local Byzantine nobility continued and the Crusader army was defeated once again in the battle of Rusion.

References 

Йордан Андреев, Милчо Лалков, Българските ханове и царе, Велико Търново, 1996.

1205 in Europe
Battles involving the Second Bulgarian Empire
Battles involving the Latin Empire
Battles in medieval Macedonia
Serres 1205
Bulgarian–Latin Wars
Medieval Macedonia
History of Serres
13th century in Bulgaria
Conflicts in 1205